Georg August Goldfuss (Goldfuß, 18 April 1782 – 2 October 1848) was a German palaeontologist, zoologist and botanist.

Goldfuss was born at Thurnau near Bayreuth. He was educated at Erlangen, where he graduated PhD in 1804 and became professor of zoology in 1818. He was subsequently appointed professor of zoology and mineralogy at the University of Bonn. Aided by Count Georg zu Münster, he issued the important  (1826–44), a work which was intended to illustrate the invertebrate fossils of Germany, but it was left incomplete after the sponges, corals, crinoids, echinoderms and part of the mollusca had been figured. A collection of Goldfuss' botanical specimens are housed at Bonn University.

Goldfuss died in Bonn.

In 1820, he coined the word protozoa to refer to single-celled organisms such as ciliates.

References 

Attribution:

Literature 

 
 Wolfhart Langer: Georg August Goldfuß - Ein biographischer Beitrag in: Bonner Geschichtsblätter, Band 23/1969, S. 229-243

External links 
 

1782 births
1848 deaths
German mineralogists
German paleontologists
19th-century German zoologists
People from the Principality of Bayreuth
University of Erlangen-Nuremberg alumni
Academic staff of the University of Erlangen-Nuremberg
Academic staff of the University of Bonn